FC Ciego de Ávila is a Cuban football team playing in the Cuban National Football League and representing Ciego de Ávila Province. They play their home games at Sergio Alonso Grandal in Morón.

History
Nicknamed Los Tiburones (the Sharks), the team won 5 league titles, the most recent one in 2014.

Honours
Campeonato Nacional de Fútbol de Cuba: 5
 1993, 2001, 2003, 2010, 2014

Current squad
2018 Season

References

Football clubs in Cuba
Ciego de Ávila